is a Japanese footballer currently playing as a goalkeeper for Gainare Tottori.

Career statistics

Club
.

Notes

References

External links

1998 births
Living people
Association football people from Tottori Prefecture
Biwako Seikei Sport College alumni
Japanese footballers
Association football goalkeepers
J3 League players
Sanfrecce Hiroshima players
Gainare Tottori players